Leonel Pérez can refer to:

 Leonel Pérez (footballer) (born 1994), Mexican footballer
 Leonel Pérez (wrestler) (born 1953), Cuban Olympic wrestler